Kyanos Asteras Vari Football Club is a Greek football club, based in Vari, Athens. It was founded in 1964 and will play for 2nd season in Football League 2 for the 2014-15.

Current squad 
As of August 2019

References

Football clubs in Attica
Gamma Ethniki clubs